The 2008 European Table Tennis Championships was held in St. Petersburg, Russia from 4–12 October 2008. The venue for the competition was Saint-Petersburg Sports and Concert Complex.

Medal summary

Men's events

Women's events

References

2008
European Championships
International sports competitions hosted by Russia
Table Tennis European Championships
Table tennis competitions in Russia
Sports competitions in Saint Petersburg
European Table Tennis Championships
October 2008 sports events in Europe